Veleropilina zografi is a Recent deep-sea (bathyal) species of monoplacophoran, a superficially limpet-like marine mollusc from the Atlantic Ocean. When this species was named it was thought to be a true limpet.

Original description 
In 1896, this species was described as Acmaea zografi by Philippe Dautzenberg and H. Fischer from an area near the Azores. It was at that point thought to be an archaeogastropod (i.e. a true limpet).

Bouchet, Mclean & Warén (1983) revealed 87 years later that this species is in fact a monoplacophoran.

Distribution 
This species occurs in the Atlantic Ocean in the Azores area.

References

External links 
 http://www.marinespecies.org/aphia.php?p=taxdetails&id=140567
  Leiden & Copenhagen.

Monoplacophora
Molluscs described in 1896